The Zeiss Touit Planar T* 1.8/32mm is a standard prime lens for Fujifilm X and Sony E mount, announced by Zeiss on September 18, 2012. Along with the Zeiss Touit 2.8/12, it is one of the first two purely Zeiss-branded autofocus models with motor-assisted manual focus.

Exterior construction
The lens features a minimalist matte-black plastic exterior with a Zeiss badge on the side of the barrel and a rubber focus ring.

Optics
The Touit 1.8/32 has "impressive" resolution, low chromatic aberration and "very good" bokeh. Uncorrected, it has 2% barrel distortion and fairly high vignetting.

Autofocus
The lens has a direct current focus motor, and according to Jamiya Wilson of The Phoblographer, focuses "quickly and accurately", and "very quietly".

See also
 List of third-party E-mount lenses
 Fujifilm X-mount Lenses
 Sigma 30mm F1.4 DC DN
 Zeiss Planar

References

Camera lenses introduced in 2012
Touit 1.8 32